John Bowyer was an English politician and in 1383 was Member of Parliament for Derby.

1300s births
Year of death unknown